Captured Tracks is an American independent record label based in Brooklyn, New York. The label was founded in 2008 by Mike Sniper.

About
Current flagship artists include: Craft Spells, DIIV and Wild Nothing.

Captured Tracks has reissued recordings by influential British artists the Monochrome Set, the Wake, the Servants, Stockholm Monsters and the Cleaners from Venus.

The label has also reissued recordings from New Zealand's Flying Nun Records, L.A.'s Medicine and Nebraska's For Against, among others.

The label's current roster of artists includes Becca Mancari, Craft Spells, DIIV, Dinner, Drahla, JayWood, Juan Wauters, Locate S,1, Martin Newell, Molly Burch, Mourn, Reptaliens, Scout Gillett, THUS LOVE, Wax Chattels, Widowspeak, and Wild Nothing.

Discography

References

External links
Official website
Roster
 Captured Tracks label profile

American independent record labels
Companies based in Brooklyn
Record labels established in 2008
Indie rock record labels
Indie pop record labels